State Route 17 (SR 17) is an east–west highway in Northeast Ohio running from North Olmsted at State Route 10 to State Route 43 in Bedford Heights.  The entire route has been paralleled by Interstate 480 and has junctions with this interstate via numerous cross streets such as Clague Road, Tiedeman Road, and Warrensville Center Road, and also via State Route 94 (State Road) and State Route 14 (Broadway Avenue).  It also has two direct junctions with the interstate.  State Route 17 provides access to many industrial and commercial areas in this area of Cleveland.

State Route 17 starts in Bedford Heights as Bartlett Road before turning onto Libby Road, Libby Road maintains its name until it hits Western Maple Heights where it becomes Granger Road. Granger Road goes from Maple Heights to Brooklyn Heights. At Brooklyn Heights before the Jennings Freeway (SR 176) it becomes Brookpark Road. Brookpark Road maintains its name until it stops at North Olmsted near Great Northern Mall.

History

SR 17 was first signed as SR 43 in 1931, along the entire SR 17 route. SR 17 was commissioned along its current route in 1935, the route went from U.S. Route 20 east to SR 43. In 1938 SR 17 was moved onto Temporary SR 17, between US 20 and east of SR 252, in Brook Park. Temporary SR 17 was removed between 1959 and 1961, moving SR 17 back to its current alignment. In 1976 the section of road between US 20 and SR 10 was decommissioned.

Major intersections

References

External links

017